Diving was contested at the 2006 Asian Games in Doha, Qatar from December 10 to December 14. Men's and women's individual and synchronized events were held.  All competition took place at the Hamad Aquatic Centre.

Schedule

Medalists

Men

Women

Medal table

Participating nations
A total of 62 athletes from 13 nations competed in diving at the 2006 Asian Games:

References 

Results

External links

 
Asia
2006
2006 Asian Games events
Diving competitions in Qatar